Aechmea tocantina is a species of flowering plant in the Bromeliaceae family. This species is native to northern and central South America (Bolivia, Peru, Brazil, Colombia, Venezuela, the Guianas).

References

tocantina
Flora of South America
Plants described in 1889
Taxa named by John Gilbert Baker